Suresh Raj Sharma (born 22 July 1940) is a Nepali educationist and the founder Vice Chancellor of Kathmandu University.

He holds a degree of Philosophy in Chemistry from the University of South Bank, London. He was the first executive director of the Council for Technical Education and Vocational Training; Member Secretary in National Education Committee; Member of National Commission for UNESCO; National Delegate to the SAARC Technical committee on science and technology etc. Dr Sharma is a well-known educational administrator. He has made significant contribution to the development of education policy in Nepal. He has a number of books, research papers, articles, secondary school curriculum textbook and many more to his credit.

At present, Sharma is the life member of the board of trustees of Kathmandu University.

Early life and education 
Sharma was born on 22 July 1940 in Khurkot V.D.C, Sindhuli District to Bishnu Prasad Upadhyaya and Savitri Devi Dhungel. Bishnu Prasad Upadhyaya was a lawyer who, although born a Dhungel, chose to write Upadhyaya as his surname. Savitri Devi Dhungel was the sister of famous writer Kul Chandra Koirala.

Sharma initially received education at home before setting out to study in Sonbarsa, India, in 1953, where he studied for nine months. In 2013 B.S he passed his School Leaving Certificate examinations from Saraswati High School, Janakpur. After completing his Isc. and Bsc. both from Public Science Campus (currently Amrit Science College) in the span of five years, Sharma went to study in Karnatak University, India under the Colombo Plan Scholarship. After returning, he spent the next ten years of his life in Tri-Chandra College. Sharma then received his PhD in Chemistry from the University of South Bank, London, in 1977.

Career 
Even before heading out to London for his PhD, Sharma had gained experience in academic and administrative areas. Sharma worked for twelve years as a professor in Tribhuvan University during which he also taught in Tri-Chandra College, Anandakuti College, Padma Kanya College and Nepal National College (currently Shankar Dev Campus). From 1989 to 1992, he worked as an executive director of the Council for Technical Education and Vocational Training. In the year 1991, he along with Sitaram Adhikary and others successfully managed to charter Kathmandu University from Parliament. A month later, he was appointed as the first-ever vice chancellor of the University.

In 2014 he was awarded an honorary doctorate by the Norwegian University of Science and Technology.

References

1940 births
Living people
Academic staff of Kathmandu University
Nepalese expatriates in the United Kingdom
People from Sindhuli District
Tri-Chandra College alumni